This is the discography of English rock band Manfred Mann.

Albums

Studio albums

Soundtrack albums

Compilation albums

Box sets

EPs

Singles

See also
 Manfred Mann's Earth Band discography

Notes

References

External links
Manfred Mann discography

Rhythm and blues discographies
Discographies of British artists
Manfred Mann